Heinz Ludwig Chaim "Harry" Ettlinger (January 28, 1926 – October 21, 2018) was one of the Monuments Men. On October 22, 2015, Ettlinger and Richard Barancik, a fellow Monuments Man, were awarded the Congressional Gold Medal. Ettlinger also worked closely with the Monuments Men Foundation for the Preservation of Art and its founder Robert M. Edsel to continue the mission of the MFAA and preserve their legacy.

Biography
Ettlinger was born in Karlsruhe, Germany on January 28, 1926. He migrated from Germany with his parents and his two brothers in September 1938.  When they arrived in the United States they first lived in Manhattan, eventually settling in Newark, New Jersey, where he graduated from East Side High School.

After leaving the service he attended Newark College of Engineering (now New Jersey Institute of Technology) on the G.I. Bill, graduating with a BS in mechanical engineering in 1950.

A resident of Rockaway Township, New Jersey, he died in 2018 at the age of 92.

In popular culture
In the film The Monuments Men the character Sam Epstein is based on Ettlinger and played by Dimitri Leonidas.

References

Further reading
 

Monuments men
1926 births
2018 deaths
American engineers
East Side High School (Newark, New Jersey) alumni
German emigrants to the United States
Jewish emigrants from Nazi Germany to the United States
People from Karlsruhe
People from Newark, New Jersey
People from Rockaway Township, New Jersey
Engineers from New Jersey